Ivett Nagy (born 28 June 1982 in Kisvárda) is a Hungarian handballer who most recently played for Nantes Loire Atlantique Handball and also has been selected to the Hungarian national team.

She made her international debut on 27 March 2003 against Brazil and participated on the European Championship a year later, winning the bronze medal.

Achievements
Nemzeti Bajnokság I:
Winner: 1999, 2001, 2003, 2004
Silver Medallist: 2002, 2005
Bronze Medallist: 2000, 2006, 2007
Magyar Kupa:
Winner: 1999, 2000, 2002, 2004
Silver Medallist: 2003, 2005
Bronze Medallist: 2007, 2008
EHF Cup:
Finalist: 2003

Personal life
She is married, her husband is Kornél Nagy, international handball player. She gave birth to their son, Artúr in 2014 and their daughter, Isabel in 2016. They live in Dunkerque, France.

References

External links
 Ivett Nagy career statistics on Worldhandball.com

1982 births
Living people
People from Kisvárda
Hungarian female handball players
Expatriate handball players
Hungarian expatriates in France
Sportspeople from Szabolcs-Szatmár-Bereg County